Anthony Cho "Tony" Vinson (born March 13, 1971) is a former American football running back. He played for the Baltimore Ravens in 1997 and 1999.

References

1971 births
Living people
American football running backs
Purdue Boilermakers football players
Towson Tigers football players
London Monarchs players
Baltimore Ravens players